South East Water is a UK supplier of drinking water to 2.2 million consumers in Kent, Sussex, Surrey, Hampshire and Berkshire and is a private limited company registered in England and Wales.

South East Water is at least 75% owned by entities domiciled outside of the United Kingdom.

Each day the company supplies on average 521 million litres of drinking water from its 83 water treatment works and manages more than 14,500 kilometres (about 9,000 miles) of its water mains. The company's supply area covers 5,657 square kilometres. The company takes water from rivers, reservoirs at Ardingly and Arlington, and underground sources (aquifers) under abstraction licences issued by the Environment Agency.

The present company came into existence in December 2007 by a merger of Mid Kent Water and an earlier separate company with the name of South East Water, thus uniting two water companies in the South East of England.

South East Water was one of eleven water providers fined by the water regulator for England and Wales, Ofwat, in October 2022. South East Water’s fine was £3.2 million. 

As of 21 December 2022, South East Water continued to receive criticism, including from MPs, as a result of widespread and long-lasting water outages affecting thousands of homes and businesses across its network. Bottled water stations were set up at several sites, but supplies quickly ran low. Various sites were forced to unexpectedly close at short notice to restock or as they became overwhelmed. 

The Guardian reported on 21 December 2022 that South East Water had admitted that it couldn’t guarantee that all customers would have their water supply restored by Christmas Day. Speaking to Kent Live, Greg Clark, MP for Tunbridge Wells and former Cabinet Minister, said: “I have spoken every day with the chief executive of South East Water, David Hinton. I wish I could tell you that I am confident that reliable supplies will be resumed imminently, but I’m afraid I can’t.” Mr Clark later described the leadership of South East Water as “deficient” in a crisis situation  

Mr Clark confirmed that he had raised the issue in The House of Commons, asked the Government to intervene, and further described South Eastern Water’s approach to resolving the crisis as “unacceptably bad and in some instances chaotic.”

References
 https://www.bbc.co.uk/news/uk-england-64025285.amp

https://www.theguardian.com/environment/2022/dec/21/thousands-in-south-east-england-face-christmas-without-running-water

External links
South East Water

Water companies of England
Companies based in Kent